Agrioceros zelaea is a moth in the family Depressariidae. It was described by Edward Meyrick in 1906. It is found in Sri Lanka.

The forewings are deep ochreous yellow with thirteen black dots: one in the middle of the base, two small ones beneath the costa near the base, one in the disc at one-sixths, one beneath the costa beyond one-fourth, one beneath the fold at two-fifths, one in the disc above the middle, five in a posterior group in the disc and one on the tornus. There is a twice interrupted black streak along the upper half of the termen. The hindwings are pale ochreous yellow.

References

Moths described in 1906
Agrioceros